Anna Jönsdotter (1820–1896), known as Kloka Anna i Vallåkra (Wise Anna of Vallåkra) or Vallåkraflickan (The Vallåkra Girl), was a Swedish cunning woman and natural healer. She was widely known and aroused considerable attention by her contemporaries through her alleged divine visions and her ability to heal the sick.  

In 1837, Jönsdotter lost consciousness on the field during the harvest work. Awakening, she claimed to have had divine visions and to have been granted the ability to heal the sick from God. After this day, she was active as a healer, and draw a lot of attention. She was at one point accused of quackery. In 1837–1838, she made a tour in Denmark, where she appeared before the monarch at the royal court to demonstrate her ability. She retired from healing after her marriage, with the claim that she lost her ability after her sexual debut.

References
 Pape, John, Kloka flickan från Vallåkra, Utgåva 1–3, Gleerups, 1949 
 https://archive.today/20130418072432/http://hd.se/helsingborg/2009/03/06/den-kloka-flickan-fraan-vallaakra/

1820 births
1896 deaths
Cunning folk
Folk healers
19th-century Swedish people
19th-century Swedish women